The pansomonads, suborder Pansomonadina (known before as order Pansomonadida), are a group of heterotrophic protists that belong to the phylum Cercozoa. Some of them are helioflagellates, with characteristics of heliozoans and amoebo-flagellates.

Morphology and ecology
They are gliding phagotrophs that inhabit the soil and, unlike Allapsina, typically form rounded lamellar pseudopodia (= lamellipodia) that spread over surfaces. They have two dense rhizoplasts linked with each mature centriole. Their centrioles are orthogona or parallel to each other. The transition zone of their cilia has a dense distal plate. They are either bacterivorous or algivorous—bacterivorous forms may have haptopodia.

Classification
Before they became a suborder of Glissomonadida, pansomonads formed a separate order called Pansomonadida. Phylogenetic analyses consistently showed that the two orders were sister groups, and it was proposed that pansomonads had evolved from glissomonads. At the same time, Viridiraptoridae was recovered as more closely related to the known pansomonads at the time than to any other glissomonad, which prompted the inclusion of viridiraptorids within pansomonads.
The current taxonomy of the pansomonads is:
Family Acinetactidae 
Acinetactis 
Family Agitatidae 
Agitata 
Family Aurigamonadidae 
Aurigamonas 
Family Viridiraptoridae 
Viridiraptor 
Orciraptor

References

Cercozoa